This is a list of Finnish football transfers for the 2016 summer transfer window. Only moves featuring 2016 Veikkausliiga are listed.

Veikkausliiga

FC Inter

In:

Out:

FC Lahti

In:

Out:

HIFK

In:

Out:

HJK

In:

Out:

IFK Mariehamn

In:

Out:

Ilves

In:

Out:

KuPS

In:

Out:

PK-35 Vantaa

In:

Out:

PS Kemi

In:

Out:

RoPS

In:

Out:

SJK

In:

Out:

VPS

In:

Out:

References

Finland
Transfers
2016